Agence Bénin Presse (ABP) is the official press agency of the government of Benin.

ABP was established in 1961. The relevant laws governing it are Law No. 94-009 of 28/07/1994 and Decree No. 2005-790 of 29/12/2005.

References

External links
Official website

Mass media in Benin
Government agencies established in 1961